Tony Danza (born Anthony Salvatore Iadanza; April 21, 1951) is an American actor. He is known for co-starring in the television series Taxi (1978–1983) and Who's the Boss? (1984–1992), for which he was nominated for an Emmy Award and four Golden Globe Awards. In 1998, Danza won the People's Choice Award for Favorite Male Performer in a New Television Series for his work on the 1997 sitcom The Tony Danza Show (not to be confused with his 2004–2006 daytime variety talk show of the same name). He has also appeared in films such as The Hollywood Knights (1980), Going Ape! (1981), Angels in the Outfield (1994), Crash (2004), and Don Jon (2013).

Early life
Danza was born on April 21, 1951, in Brooklyn, New York, to parents Anna Mary (née Camisa; 1925–1993) and Matthew Anthony "Matty" Iadanza (1920–1983). His mother was a bookkeeper and his father worked as a waste collector in Brooklyn. Danza's paternal grandparents were from Pietrelcina, Benevento, Campania, Italy, and his mother was an immigrant from the town of Campobello di Mazara in the Sicilian province of Trapani. He has a younger brother, Matty Jr. (born 1954), a Los Angeles restaurant owner. He lived in East New York, Brooklyn until he was 14, and his family relocated to Malverne, New York, on Long Island. Danza attended Malverne Senior High School, graduating in 1968. In the first episode of his show Teach: Tony Danza, Danza describes himself as a "bad student" in high school. He earned a bachelor's degree in history in 1972 from the University of Dubuque, which he attended on a wrestling scholarship. In 1975, as a joke, Danza's friends entered him in the New York City Golden Gloves. After knocking out his first six opponents all in the first round, Danza was knocked out in the finals.

During his first year of college, he had the Robert Crumb "Keep on Truckin'" character tattooed on his upper right arm. In a 1985 interview in Us Weekly magazine, Danza remarked, "I was playing pool with a guy who had all these tattoos, and I wanted to be friends." Danza also sports a "Keep Punching" boxing gloves tattoo on his right shoulder as well as "Tracy", his (former) wife's name, on his chest. In college, Danza met and married his first wife.

Career

Boxer
Danza was a professional boxer with a record of 9 wins and 3 losses (9 knockouts, 7 in the first round), with all but one of his fights ending in a knockout, including three technical knockouts.

Acting and show business

Shortly after his college graduation from the University of Dubuque, Danza was discovered by a producer at a boxing gymnasium in New York. He then earned a spot on the television show Taxi, playing a cab driver and part-time boxer Tony Banta, and later starred on Who's the Boss?, in which he portrayed Tony Micelli, a former baseball player, housekeeper, and single father. For his contribution to the television industry, in 1988, Danza was honored with a star on the Hollywood Walk of Fame at 7000 Hollywood Boulevard. Danza also plays the role of Mel Clark, a baseball player, in Angels in the Outfield (1994).

Danza also starred in the short-lived sitcoms Hudson Street (1995) and The Tony Danza Show (1997), not to be confused with his 2004–2006 talk show, The Tony Danza Show. He had a role in the TV drama Family Law from 2000 until 2002.

He was nominated for an Emmy Award for a guest-starring 1998 role in the TV series The Practice. His movie debut was in the comedy The Hollywood Knights (1980), which was followed by Going Ape! (1981). He received critical acclaim for his performance in the 1999 Broadway revival of the Eugene O'Neill play The Iceman Cometh. In 2002, Danza released his debut album The House I Live In as a 1950s-style crooner.

Danza hosted his own TV talk show, The Tony Danza Show, that was produced each weekday morning in his hometown of New York and was syndicated across the US. On May 9, 2005, during a go-kart race with NASCAR star Rusty Wallace, who was a guest on the show, Danza's kart flipped after Wallace accidentally bumped him. Neither he nor Wallace was wearing a helmet at the time, and both were uninjured. Danza returned to go-kart racing on October 20, 2005, to challenge IndyCar driver Danica Patrick, but his brakes malfunctioned and he skidded into a wall, unharmed. His daytime talk show ended in May 2006; the last live episode aired on May 26, 2006.

He starred on Broadway as Max Bialystock in The Producers, from December 19, 2006, to March 11, 2007, and reprised his role at the Paris Las Vegas from August 13, 2007, to February 9, 2008.

Danza hosted the 4th season of The Contender in 2008.

A Broadway adaptation of the 1992 film Honeymoon in Vegas opened on a pre-Broadway run at New Jersey's Paper Mill Playhouse on September 26, 2013, co-starring Danza and Tony nominee Rob McClure, with Gary Griffin directing. Danza was inducted into the Ride of Fame in December 2014, and the double-decker sightseeing bus commemorated his role in the Broadway musical.

Danza starred as Tony Caruso Sr. in the 2018 Netflix series, The Good Cop as "a disgraced, former NYPD officer who never followed the rules." It was cancelled after one season.

Teaching
During the 2009–2010 school year Danza filmed A&E reality show Teach: Tony Danza, in which he co-instructed a 10th grade English class at Northeast High School in Philadelphia.  It premiered on October 1, 2010. The book I'd Like to Apologize to Every Teacher I Ever Had: My Year as a Rookie Teacher at Northeast High, which was released in 2012, was based on his year of teaching.

Personal life
Danza's first marriage was to Rhonda Yeoman. They wed in 1970 and divorced in 1974. Their son Marc appeared with Danza on Taxi in two episodes as Brian Sims.

In 1986, Danza married Tracy Robinson. The couple separated in 2006 and filed for divorce on March 10, 2011; the divorce was finalized on February 6, 2013. They have two daughters.

In 2008, Danza and his son Marc co-authored a cookbook, Don't Fill Up on the Antipasto: Tony Danza's Father-Son Cookbook.

At one point Danza was a partner in Alleva Dairy, promoted as America's oldest cheese shop, on Grand Street in the Little Italy section of Manhattan.

Boxing record
Source:

|- align=center
|12 || Win || 9–3 || align=left| || KO || 3  ||  ||  || Phoenix, Arizona, US ||
|- align=center
|11 || Win || 8–3 || align=left| || KO || 1  ||  ||  || Felt Forum, New York City, New York City ||
|- align=center
|10 || Win || 7–3 || align=left| || KO || 1  ||  ||  || Brooklyn, New York City ||
|- align=center
|9 || Win || 6–3 || align=left|   || KO || 1  ||  ||  || Brooklyn, New York City ||
|- align=center
|8 || Win || 5–3 || align=left| || KO || 1  ||  ||      || Roll-a-Rama, Brooklyn, New York City ||
|- align=center
|7 || Loss || 4–3 || align=left| || TKO || 1  ||  ||  ||   Westchester County Center, White Plains, New York City   ||
|- align=center
|6 || Win || 4–2 || align=left| || TKO || 1  ||  ||  || Nanuet, New York City ||
|- align=center
|5 || Win || 3–2 || align=left| || TKO || 1  ||  ||  ||   Westchester County Center, White Plains, New York City   ||
|- align=center
|4 || Win || 2–2 || align=left| || KO || 3  ||  ||  || Long Island Arena, Commack, New York City ||
|- align=center
|3 || Loss || 1–2 || align=left| || Points || 4 ||  ||  || Dover, New Jersey, USA ||
|- align=center
|2 || Loss || 1–1 || align=left| || KO || 1  ||  ||  || Sunnyside Gardens, Queens, New York City ||
|- align=center
|1 || Win || 1–0 || align=left| || KO || 1  ||  ||  || New York City ||
|}

Filmography

Film

Television

Awards and nominations
Nominated - Golden Globe Award for Best Supporting Actor - Series, Miniseries or Television Film for Taxi (1979)
Nominated for the Golden Globe Award for Best Actor - Television Series Musical or Comedy for Who's the Boss? (1986)
Nominated for the Golden Globe Award for Best Actor - Television Series Musical or Comedy for Who's the Boss? (1987)
Nominated for the Golden Globe Award for Best Actor - Television Series Musical or Comedy for Who's the Boss? (1989)
Nominated - Golden Raspberry Award for Worst Actor for She's Out of Control (1989)
Nominated - TV Land Award for Single Dad of the Year for Who's the Boss?
Won the People's Choice Award for Favorite Male Performer in a Television Series for The Tony Danza Show (1997)
Nominated for the Primetime Emmy Award for Outstanding Guest Actor in a Drama Series for The Practice (1998)

References

External links

 
 
 
 
 

1951 births
Living people
20th-century American male actors
21st-century American male actors
American people of Italian descent
American male boxers
American male dancers
American male film actors
American male musical theatre actors
American male stage actors
American male television actors
American tap dancers
American television talk show hosts
Beauty pageant hosts
Male actors from New York City
Malverne High School alumni
Musicians from Brooklyn
People from East New York, Brooklyn
People from Malverne, New York
University of Dubuque alumni